Bethel, meaning 'House of El' or 'House of God' in Hebrew, Phoenician and Aramaic, is thought by some to be the name of a god or an aspect of a god in some ancient middle-eastern texts dating to Assyrian, Persian and Hellenistic periods. The term appears in the Hebrew and Christian Bibles, but opinions differ as to whether those references are to a god or to a place.

Historical records 
A 1977 book by Javier Teixidor cited some early references that support viewing Bethel as a god of Aramaean or Syrian origin. The author maintains that the origin of the god's cult is unknown, but provides what he believes to be some of the earliest references to the god:  
 theophorous names in the 7th century BC,
 a 677 BC treaty between King Esarhaddon of Assyria and Ba‘al I, king of Tyre, which associates Bethel with what is apparently another god, Anat-Bethel, in a curse upon the Tyrians if they break the treaty: "May Bethel and Anat-Bethel deliver you to a man-eating lion"; and
 an Aramaic tablet from Aleppo dating to 570 BC, which contains three theophoric names of the god Bethel.

Teixodir states that the god Bethel became popular during the Neo-Babylonian period, which began in the 7th century BC. He found numerous references to the cult of Bethel in fifth-century Egypt literature, and notes that Bethel is mentioned, but with no details, in Elephantine and Hermopolis papyri. Those papyri also mention gods with names that are variants of Bethel: Eshembethel 'Name of Bethel' and Ḥerembethel 'Sanctuary of Bethel' (cf. Arabic ḥaram 'sanctuary').

The ancient Phoenician Sanchuniathon mentions the god Baitylos as a brother of the gods El and Dagon. He later says that the god Sky devised the baitylia, having contrived to put life into stones. The reference would seem to be to Bethels in the plural, that is to many stones like the stone in the Israelite city of Bethel which served a housing for God in Israelite belief. Compare the Egyptian goddess Hathor whose name means 'House of Horus'.

Biblical references 
The term Bethel or Beth-El appears in the Hebrew Bible and the Old Testament, but opinions differ as to whether these references are to a god or to a place.

Porten suspects that the Bethel mentioned in The Book of Jeremiah at chapter 48, verse 13 is a reference to the god Bethel, rather than the city named Bethel. Jeremiah 48:13 states: "Then Moab shall be ashamed of Chemosh, as the House of Israel was ashamed of Bethel, their confidence." 

On the other hand, Biblical scholar Rodney Hutton says that the Bethel referred to in Jeremiah 48:13 is a location or city, and a metaphor for religious apostasy because it was the place where Jeroboam installed the golden calf.

There is further support among Biblical scholars for the view of Bethel as a location rather than a god:
 Hutton regards Bethel as a place, not a god, in his commentary on The Book of Samuel 7:16: "Jacob gave the site, where God had spoken to him, the name of Bethel."
 Biblical scholar David M. Carr's commentary on The Book of Genesis generally regards Bethel as a place, in the context it appears in  35:9-35:15 and 31.13. Also, with respect to the phrase "I am the God of Bethel" at 31:13, Carr states that the Hebrew is unclear, raising further doubt.
 The Rabbinical Assembly of The United Synagogue of Conservative Judaism, in its commentary on "The Revelation at Bethel" (Genesis 35:9-15) follows the medieval Rabbinic commentaries and also treats Bethel as a place. 

Another interpretation is that the stone which Jacob placed at Bethel, which was named House-of-God, was also a god in itself, a manifestation of the god Bethel.

 may give the personal name Bethelsharezer ('May Bethel protect the king'). This is a verse in which translators greatly differ as to whether Bethel means the town of Bethel which sent Sharezer, or that Sharezar and his fellows were sent to the House of God (that is the temple in Jerusalem), or that "they" sent Bethelsharezer and his fellows.

References

Deities in the Hebrew Bible